Harun Nasution (1919 – 18 September 1998) was an Indonesian scholar whose work was part of a small but significant trend within Islamic thought to champion rationalist and humanist principles.

Biography
Nasution spent much of his youth outside of Indonesia, living in Arabia and Egypt before moving to Europe and eventually Canada. His father had been a traditional religious scholar, who despite his own immersion in Arabic and Islamic culture sent his son to a Dutch primary school. Nasution did, however, attend an Islamic secondary school, although one that taught secular as well as religious subjects. After an unhappy period of further study in Mecca, he went to Egypt, where he attended lectures at al-Azhar University in Cairo. In 1962 he began studying at the Institute of Islamic Studies at McGill University in Montreal. His doctoral studies were on the theology of Muhammad Abduh, focusing on the extent to which Abduh had been influenced by Mu'tazila teachings.  Nasution completed his PhD in 1969 and then returned to Indonesia, where he took up a position at IAIN in Jakarta.

It was there that he first suggested that the technological and economic decline of the Muslim world was partly due to its embrace of the Ash'arite school of theology, which he regarded as fatalistic. He was particularly hostile to the occasionalism that became dominant in medieval Muslim thought, holding that its denial of the existence of secondary (created) causes hindered scientific enquiry. Nasution's solution was to defend a revival of the Mutazila view, which was (and still is) widely regarded by Muslims as a heresy. What Nasution admires in Mutazila thought is its emphasis on human reason in matters religious. In the basic teachings of the Mutazila, he writes,

it is possible to discern a form of rationalism, but not a rationalism that opposes religion or rejects the absolute truth of revelation... It is also possible to discern a form of naturalism, but not an atheistic naturalism that denies the existence and greatness of God... There is also human freedom and dynamism, but not absolute freedom from the design established by God... The doctrines of dynamism, human freedom and accountability, rationalism and naturalism taught by the Mu'tazila contributed significantly to the development of philosophy and the religious and secular sciences during the Classical Period of Islamic civilization.

Nasution's influence on his fellow Indonesia thinkers is significant. His fellow Indonesian thinker Nurcholish Madjid argues that Nasution was an important influence in the development of modern Indonesian religious thought, particularly through his influence on students at IAIN. He is less known outside that country but he forms part of a significant movement that includes other "modernist" thinkers such as Mohammed Arkoun and Nasr Hamid Abu Zayd.

References

1919 births
1998 deaths
20th-century Muslim scholars of Islam
Indonesian Muslim scholars of Islam
Al-Azhar University alumni
McGill University Institute of Islamic Studies alumni
Muslim reformers